Azzam al-Ahmad (born 1947 in Rummanah, Jenin) (previously Minister of Public Works and Housing portfolio added on 9 June 2002) received a BA in Economics from Baghdad University. He was the head of the General Union of Palestinian Students (GUPS) in Iraq from 1971-1974, deputy head of GUPS Executive Committee from 1974–1980, Palestine Liberation Organization ambassador to Iraq from 1979-1994. He was also a Fatah-RC member from 1989 and is a member of the Palestinian Legislative Council representing the Jenin Governorate as a Fatah candidate.

Early life and family
Al-Ahmad was born in the village of Rummanah, located in north of Jenin.  In 1968, His father, Najeeb al-Ahmad, was deported across the Jordan River by the Israeli Army after its occupation of the West Bank. while in exile in Amman after 1967, Najeeb and his family of nine children found fertile grounds for their cause and political activities. Soon after deportation, Najeeb became a prominent member of the Jordanian parliament. Azzam al-Ahmad graduated from high school and joined the Syrian universities but later moved to Baghdad with the coming of the Ba'ath party to power in Iraq in 1969 as a staunch supporter of the Palestinian cause.

References

Fatah members
1947 births
Living people
University of Baghdad alumni
Government ministers of the Palestinian National Authority
Members of the 2006 Palestinian Legislative Council
Members of the 1996 Palestinian Legislative Council
Members of the Executive Committee of the Palestine Liberation Organization
Central Committee of Fatah members